Ignace Water Aerodrome  is located on Agimak Lake near Ignace, Ontario, Canada.

See also
Ignace Municipal Airport

References

Registered aerodromes in Kenora District
Seaplane bases in Ontario